The Secrets were an American girl group. It may also refer to:
 The Secrets (TV series)
 The Secrets (film)
 The Secrets (Canadian band)

See also 
 Secret (disambiguation)
 Secrets